Samuel Wadsworth Gould (January 1, 1852 – December 19, 1935) was a United States representative from Maine.  He was born in Porter.  He moved with his parents to Hiram, and attended the public schools and North Parsonsfield Seminary.  He graduated from the University of Maine in 1877.  Gould studied law, was admitted to the bar and commenced practice in Skowhegan in 1879.  He served as postmaster of Skowhegan 1896–1900.

Gould attended all Democratic State conventions for more than forty years, served as secretary of the Maine Democratic State Committee 1882–1890.  He was a  delegate to the Democratic National Conventions in 1900, 1908, and 1912. He  unsuccessful candidate for Governor of Maine in 1902 and for election to the Sixty-first Congress in 1908.

He was  elected on the Democratic ticket to the Sixty-second Congress (March 4, 1911 – March 3, 1913).  He was an unsuccessful candidate for reelection in 1912.  He resumed the practice of law in Skowhegan, became interested in various business enterprises and served as president of the board of trustees of the University of Maine. He died in Skowhegan. His interment was in Southside Cemetery.

See also
Gould House (Skowhegan, Maine), his home in Skowhegan.

References
 

1852 births
1935 deaths
University of Maine alumni
People from Skowhegan, Maine
Maine lawyers
Maine postmasters
Democratic Party members of the United States House of Representatives from Maine
People from Oxford County, Maine
People from Hiram, Maine
Burials in Maine